The Otay Formation is a geologic formation in San Diego County, California (United States) and northern Baja California state (Mexico).  It is within the Peninsular Ranges province.

Fossils 
It preserves fossils of the Oligocene to Miocene periods of the Cenozoic Era. Fossils in the Sweetwater Formation that underlies the Otay Formation are of the Late Eocene period.

See also 

 List of fossiliferous stratigraphic units in California
 Paleontology in California
 List of fossiliferous stratigraphic units in Mexico

References

Further reading

External links 
 

Geologic formations of California
Geologic formations of Mexico
Miocene Series of North America
Oligocene Series of North America
Miocene California
Neogene Mexico
Paleogene California
Paleogene Mexico
Geology of San Diego County, California
Geography of Baja California
Natural history of Baja California